Gerda Weissmann Klein  (May 8, 1924 – April 3, 2022) was a Polish-born American writer and human rights activist. Her autobiographical account of the Holocaust, All but My Life (1957), was adapted for the 1995 short film, One Survivor Remembers, which received an Academy Award and an Emmy Award, and was selected for the National Film Registry. She married Kurt Klein (1920–2002) in 1946.

The Kleins became advocates of Holocaust education and human rights, dedicating most of their lives to promoting tolerance and community service. A naturalized U.S. citizen, Gerda Weissmann Klein also founded Citizenship Counts, a nonprofit organization that champions the value and responsibilities of American citizenship. She has served on the governing board of the United States Holocaust Memorial Museum, which features her testimony in a permanent exhibit.

On February 15, 2011, Klein was presented with the Presidential Medal of Freedom, the highest civilian award in the United States.

Early life

Gerda Weissmann, the second child of manufacturing executive Julius Weissmann and Helene (née Mueckenbrunn) Weissmann, was born May 8, 1924, in Bielsko (now Bielsko-Biała), Poland. She attended Notre Dame Gymnasium in Bielsko until the Germans invaded Poland in 1939. Both of her parents and her older brother Arthur (b. 1919) were murdered in the Holocaust.

Life under the Nazis
On September 3, 1939, German troops invaded fifteen-year-old Weissmann's home in Bielsko, Poland. Shortly after the invasion began, the family received a telegram from Gerda's uncle saying the Germans were advancing quickly, and the family should leave Poland immediately. They stayed because Gerda's father had suffered a heart attack. His doctors advised that he not be moved or subjected to undue stress.

In 1942, Julius Weissmann was sent to a death camp where he was murdered. Not long afterwards, the ghetto where Weissmann Klein and her mother lived was liquidated. Helene Weissman was forced into a group slated for a death camp; Gerda, deemed fit for work, was sent to a labor camp. As she and others boarded trucks, Gerda jumped out in a frantic effort to reunite with her mother. According to Weissmann Klein's account, Moshe Merin, head of the local Jewish Council Judenrat, threw her back in her truck, saying "You are too young to die."

Liberation
In May 1945, Weissmann was liberated by forces of the United States Army in Volary, Czechoslovakia; these forces included Lieutenant Kurt Klein, who was born in Germany. A teenage Klein immigrated to the United States in 1937 to escape Nazism. Klein's parents were murdered at Auschwitz concentration camp. When Kurt Klein first encountered Gerda Weissmann, who was one day short of her 21st birthday, she was white-haired, weighed 68 pounds, and dressed in rags. When she hesitantly informed Klein she was a Jew, he emotionally revealed that he was Jewish as well. After a courtship of several months, Gerda and Kurt were engaged in September 1945. Diplomatic and immigration restrictions delayed their wedding for a year, but Kurt finally returned to Europe from the U.S. in 1946 and they were married in Paris.

Life after the War
After the war, the Kleins moved to and raised three children in Buffalo, New York, where Kurt ran a printing business and Gerda became a writer and spent 17 years as a columnist for The Buffalo News.

The documentary, One Survivor Remembers, (1995) based on Gerda Klein's autobiography, All But My Life, produced and directed by Kary Antholis, and distributed by HBO Films, won the 1995 Academy Award for Best Documentary (Short Subject). After Antholis delivered his acceptance speech, Weissmann Klein stepped up to the podium and delivered her own set of remarks:

I have been in a place for six incredible years where winning meant a crust of bread and to live another day. Since the blessed day of my liberation I have asked the question, why am I here? I am no better. In my mind's eye I see those years and days and those who never lived to see the magic of a boring evening at home. On their behalf I wish to thank you for honoring their memory, and you cannot do it in any better way than when you return to your homes tonight to realize that each of you who know the joy of freedom are winners.

Weissmann Klein has published several memoirs and children's stories, including The Windsor Caper (2013), a weekly serial in The Buffalo News during the 1980s, about two American girls who have a night-time adventure in Windsor Castle, England. Weissmann Klein describes it as her only work that is "not rooted in pain".

Weissmann Klein lived in Buffalo for several decades until her husband Kurt retired and they moved to Arizona in 1985 to be closer to their children and grandchildren. She died in Phoenix on April 3, 2022, at the age of 97.

Awards and recognition

Presidential Medal of Freedom 
On February 15, 2011, President Barack Obama presented Weissmann Klein and 14 other recipients with the 2010 Presidential Medal of Freedom the highest civilian award in the United States. At the ceremony in the East Room of the White House, President Obama announced, "This year's Medal of Freedom recipients reveal the best of who we are and who we aspire to be." He stated the following as Klein was presented with her Presidential Medal of Freedom:

By the time she was 21, Gerda Klein had spent six years living under Nazi rule—three of them in concentration camps. Her parents and brother had been taken away. Her best friend had died in her arms during a  death march. And she weighed only  when she was found by American forces in an abandoned bicycle factory. But Gerda survived. She married the soldier who rescued her. And ever since—as an author, a historian, and a crusader for tolerance—she has taught the world that it is often in our most hopeless moments that we discover the extent of our strength and the depth of our love.

President Obama then read a statement from Weissmann Klein: "I pray you never stand at any crossroads in your own lives, but if you do, if the darkness seems so total, if you think there is no way out, remember, never ever give up."

Additional recognition 
Weissmann Klein was selected to be the keynote speaker at the United Nations' first annual International Holocaust Remembrance Day in January 2006. She spoke to school children and traveled the world to spread her message of tolerance and hope, meeting with world leaders. In 1996, Weissmann Klein received the international Lion of Judah award in Jerusalem.  She received an honorary doctorate in Humane Letters from Rosary Hill College in 1975.

In 1997, President Bill Clinton appointed Weissmann Klein to the United States Holocaust Memorial Museum's Governing Council. In 2007, the museum bestowed Weissmann Klein with its highest honor at The Arizona Biltmore before 1,000 guests. She was inducted into the Arizona Women's Hall of Fame in 2021.

Bibliography
 1957: All But My Life. New York: Hill & Wang, 1957, expanded edition 1995. .
 1974: The Blue Rose. Photographs by Norma Holt. New York: L. Hill, 1974. .
 1981: Promise of a New Spring: The Holocaust and Renewal. Illustrated by Vincent Tartaro. Chappaqua, N.Y.: Rossel Books, 1981. .
 1984: A Passion for Sharing: The Life of Edith Rosenwald Stern. Chappaqua, N.Y.: Rossel, 1984. .
 1986: Peregrinations: Adventures with the Green Parrot. Illustrations by Chabela. Buffalo, N.Y.: Josephine Goodyear Committee, 1986. .
 2000: The Hours After: Letters of Love and Longing in the War's Aftermath. Written with Kurt Klein. New York: St. Martin's Press, 2000. .
 2004: A Boring Evening at Home. Washington, D.C.: Leading Authorities Press, 2004. .
 2007: Wings of EPOH. Illustrated by Peter Reynolds. [S.l.]: FableVision Press, 2007. .
 2009: One Raspberry. Illustrated by Judy Hodge. Klein, 2009. .
 2013: The Windsor Caper. Illustrated by Tim Oliver. Martin Good, 2013. .

Filmography
 1995: One Survivor Remembers
 1996: 60 Minutes: "One Survivor Remembers" CBS
 2005: About Face: The Story of the Jewish Refugee Soldiers of World War II

References

External links
 Citizenship Counts official site
 Gerda Weissmann and Kurt Klein Papers 1940s–2011 (bulk 1940s-2001). ASU Libraries, Arizona State University.
 Gerda Weissmann at the USHMM Holocaust Encyclopedia
 The Shoah Foundation
 
 

1924 births
2022 deaths
Polish emigrants to the United States
Jewish American writers
Gross-Rosen concentration camp survivors
People from Bielsko
20th-century Polish Jews
20th-century Polish women writers
Presidential Medal of Freedom recipients
Naturalized citizens of the United States
21st-century American Jews
American people of Polish-Jewish descent
21st-century Polish women writers
20th-century American women writers
21st-century American women writers
American human rights activists
Women human rights activists